Combat Vehicles Research and Development Establishment (CVRDE) is a laboratory of the Defence Research and Development Organisation (DRDO). Located at Avadi, in Chennai, India. It is the main DRDO lab involved in the development of Armoured fighting vehicles, Tanks, Automotive electronics and many other.

History 
After the Independence of India, the Chief Inspectorate of Mechanical Transport Establishment (MTE), which was previously located in Chaklala, Pakistan, was moved to Ahmednagar. It was later renamed as Vehicle Research & Development Establishment (VRDE), Ahmednagar.

In 1965, the Heavy Vehicles Factory under the Ordnance Factory Board was set up at Avadi to manufacture Vijayanta Tanks. A detachment of VRDE was established there to provide R&D support. In March 1976, the VRDE detachment at Avadi was split off from VRDE and re-designated as Combat Vehicles Research & Development Establishment (CVRDE), as an independent DRDO laboratory responsible for Research & Development of Armoured Fighting Vehicles.

Areas of Work 
CVRDE has been tasked with the design, development and testing of tracked combat vehicles and specialized tracked vehicles. It has also designed certain aircraft subsystems, mainly related to the engine and hydraulics. Like many DRDO labs, it also develops civilian technologies based on spin-offs of the defence related products developed by it. It has recently started developing Unmanned Ground Vehicles of the tracked category.

Projects and Products 
CVRDE is the main research lab responsible for the development of the Arjun MBT, 248 of which have been ordered by the Indian Army. It has also developed the Tank-EX, Bhim Self Propelled Artillery, based on the Arjun Chassis, and the Combat Improved Ajeya, an upgrade of the Indian Army's T-72 Tanks.

Apart from these, CVRDE has also developed other combat and Engineering Vehicles, like Armored Cars, Bridge-layer Tanks, Armoured Recovery Vehicles and a Mortar Carrier based on the BMP-2 chassis.

CVRDE is also working on many technologies related to Armoured Fighting vehicles. CVRDE has a division dedicated to development of Automatic transmissions for Armored Fighting Vehicles. It has developed transmissions of various power ranges viz. 1500, 800, 150 hp. It has developed various subsystems of transmission like torque converter, Fluid coupling and retarder, Steering units, Final drives etc.
Muntra, India's first ever unmanned armored vehicle was developed here.

See also
 Armoured Vehicle Tracked Light Repair
 BLT T-72
 CMF T-72
 Drdo Armoured Ambulance
 DRDO light tank
 M-46 Catapult

References

External links 
 CVRDE Home Page
 Products developed by CVRDE

Defence Research and Development Organisation laboratories
Research institutes in Chennai
Research institutes in Tamil Nadu
Research institutes established in 1975
1975 establishments in Tamil Nadu